Blackstock Road is a major road in North London, England, running from Seven Sisters Road south westerly to Highbury.

Facilities

Blackstock Road hosts a diverse array of independent shops, cafes and restaurants. At its south end there are a number of public houses, while at the north end there are Algerian cafés, with many restaurants and shops running along its length up towards Highbury Park. Pubs en route include the Blackstock, The Kings Head, the Arsenal Tavern, the Woodbine, the Gunners and the Bank of Friendship.

Transport

Blackstock Road is very well served by public transport. There are four bus services running along it, the 4, 19, 106 and 236, reaching out to Battersea, Waterloo or Archway, Hackney Wick and Whitechapel respectively. Blackstock Road is also in close proximity to Finsbury Park station at its northern end, providing easy access to the Victoria line and Piccadilly line. Arsenal station on Gillespie Road is within five minutes walk of the southern end of Blackstock Road.

Police raids

On 28 March 2008, the road was the location of a large-scale Metropolitan Police investigation and culminating in raids where 1400 officers searched for stolen items and criminal behaviour. According to sources, they found, "350 stolen items including 120 laptops, 110 cameras, 32 iPods, 20 sat-navs and 47 fake passports and driving licences."

According to the Independent newspaper, on 3 November 2009 "riot police returned in force after a flood of fresh complaints that it remained a crime hotspot. At least 30 residents have given police statements complaining about intimidation and the sexual harassment of women", "crime and anti-social behaviour."

History

The Hackney Brook flowed through the south westerly end of Blackstock Road from its source in Holloway before emptying into the River Lea at Hackney Wick. The book "The Groundwater Diaries" by Tim Bradford (jokingly) states that the 'Bank of Friendship' pub is so named because the people of Highbury used to wave at the folk of Stoke Newington across the river.

Blackstock Road's original name was Boarded River Lane when it was still a dirt track.

The river that used to run into where Blackstock Road sits now originated near Newington Green, cutting across Highbury Vale, over where Wilberforce Road, Queen's Drive and Finsbury Park Road now are. On the river in the 18th century was a renowned hostelry known as the Eel Pie House, serving pies with eels that had been fished out of the river. The pie houses' location is thought to have been located on the spot where 57 Wilberforce Road now stands (according to the Encyclopedia of London).

In popular culture

The road is used as a prominent location in the 2009 film London River.

Other Blackstock Roads

There is another Blackstock Road in the Hemsworth area of Sheffield.

External links
 Brownswood community website.
 FinFuture - Finsbury Park area lobby group.
 A blog for Finsbury Park N4.

References

 Article on British History.ac.uk

Streets in the London Borough of Hackney
Streets in the London Borough of Islington